Charles Traoré (born 1 January 1992) is a Malian professional footballer who plays as a left-back for French club FC Nantes and the Mali national team.

Club career
Traoré joined Troyes in August 2015. He made his professional debut a few months later,  in a 3–1 Ligue 1 victory against Lille.

On 31 August 2018, the last day of the 2018 summer transfer window, Traoré joined Ligue 1 side FC Nantes on a three-year contract.

International career
Traoré was born in France to parents of Malian descent. He made his debut for the Mali national team in a friendly 1–0 loss to Nigeria on 27 May 2016.

References

External links
 
 
 

1992 births
Living people
French sportspeople of Malian descent
Citizens of Mali through descent
Malian footballers
French footballers
Association football defenders
Mali international footballers
2017 Africa Cup of Nations players
2021 Africa Cup of Nations players
Ligue 1 players
Ligue 2 players
ES Troyes AC players
FC Nantes players